The Ambassador and Permanent Representative of Australia to the United Nations is an officer of the Australian Department of Foreign Affairs and Trade and the head of the Permanent Mission of the Commonwealth of Australia to the United Nations in New York. The position has the rank and status of an Ambassador Extraordinary and Plenipotentiary and is the lead Australian representative to the UN, although that role is also shared with representatives present at the United Nations Office in Geneva, the United Nations Office in Vienna and the United Nations Office at Nairobi, and the delegations to UNESCO and the United Nations Agencies in Rome. Australia is a charter member of the United Nations and has sent representatives to New York since 1946.

The Permanent Representative, currently Mitch Fifield, is charged with representing Australia during plenary meetings of the General Assembly and, when Australia holds a non-permanent seat or by invitation, the Security Council, except in the rare situation in which a more senior officer (such as the Minister for Foreign Affairs or the Prime Minister of Australia) is present. The post is appointed by the Governor-General of Australia in the name of the monarch, and nominated by the Prime Minister.

List of Permanent Representatives

See also
Australia and the United Nations
List of High Commissioners and Ambassadors of Australia

References

External links
Australian Permanent Mission to the United Nations - New York

 
Australia
United Nations